The Wisconsin Department of Commerce was a department in the executive branch of the Government of Wisconsin. It was responsible for implementing and overseeing the economic development programs for Wisconsin through consultation, technical assistance, and relocation assistance. It also administered the distribution of federal economic assistance programs to local governments and businesses, and acts as a go-between for businesses and other government agencies. The department also enforced laws regarding safety and sanitation in buildings, petroleum products, and petroleum tanks. It also gave housing assistance to low income families.

The Department of Commerce was administered by the Wisconsin Secretary of Commerce, who was appointed by the governor with the advice and consent of the Wisconsin State Senate.

The department traced its roots to the Division of Industrial Development within the Office of the Governor, as established by the Wisconsin Legislature in 1955. It was renamed the Division of Economic Development in 1959. This division changed superseding departments over the decades until it was promoted to department status as the Department of Business Development in 1971. It was renamed the Department of Development in 1979, and finally the Department of Commerce in 1995. As of July 1, 2011, functions once performed by the Wisconsin Department of Commerce have been moved to the Department of Safety and Professional Services, other state agencies, and the Wisconsin Economic Development Corporation. The Wisconsin Economic Development Corporation (WEDC) is the state’s lead economic development organization.

Past Commerce Divisions
The following units are part of the Department of Commerce and report to the Secretary of Commerce:
 Division of Administrative Services
 Bureau of Fiscal Services and Procurement
 Bureau of Human Resources, Facilities and Safety
 Bureau of Information Technology
 Bureau of Policy and Budget Development
 Division of Business Development
 Bureau of Business Development
 Bureau of Business Finance and Compliance
 Bureau of Entrepreneurship and Technology
 Bureau of Minority Business Development
 Division of Environmental and Regulatory Services
 Bureau of Petroleum
 Environmental Cleanup Fund Administration
 Bureau of Petroleum Products and Tanks
 Division of Global Ventures
 Bureau of Export Development
 Division of Housing and Community Development
 Bureau of Community Finance
 Bureau of Planning and Technical Assistance
 Bureau of Supportive Housing
 Division of Safety and Buildings
 Bureau of Integrated Services
 Bureau of Program Development

External links
 Wisconsin Economic Development Corporation
 Wisconsin Department of Safety and Professional Services

Government of Wisconsin
State departments of commerce of the United States
Government agencies established in 1995
Government agencies disestablished in 2011